Sjeng Schalken was the defending champion but lost in the first round to Taylor Dent.

Paradorn Srichaphan won in the final 6–7(2–7), 6–0, 6–3, 6–2 against Marcelo Ríos.

Seeds

  Lleyton Hewitt (second round)
  Sjeng Schalken (first round)
  Guillermo Cañas (second round)
  Thomas Johansson (first round)
  Juan Ignacio Chela (first round)
  Marcelo Ríos (final)
  Paradorn Srichaphan (champion)
  Rainer Schüttler (second round)

Draw

Final

Section 1

Section 2

External links
 Main draw 
 Qualifying draw 

Singles
2002 Stockholm Open